Mother Earth Tour is Dutch metal band Within Temptation's first live DVD. It was released as a double DVD, including a live CD with the track list of the first DVD. The first disc features a live concert with footage from the 2002 rock festivals Rock Werchter, Pukkelpop and Lowlands.

Songs from this live DVD were also used in singles, and special editions of Mother Earth.

The video album was a winner of the 2003 Dutch Edison Award and reached Gold status in the Netherlands.

The DVD was released with three audio options: 5.1 Dolby Digital; 2.0 Dolby Digital; DTS.

It was released digitally on August 26, 2021.

Track listing

Disc 1
 "Deceiver of Fools" (Live from Lowlands)
 "Caged" (Live from Lowlands)
 "Mother Earth" (Live from Pukkelpop)
 "Enter" (Live from Pukkelpop)
 "Our Farewell" (Live from Lowlands)
 "The Dance" (Live from Lowlands)
 "The Promise" (Live from Rock Werchter)
 "Dark Wings" (Live from Rock Werchter)
 "Restless" (Live from Lowlands)
 "Deep Within" (Live from Lowlands)
 "Never-ending Story" (Live from Lowlands)
 "Ice Queen" (Live from Lowlands)

Music videos:
 "The Dance"
 "Ice Queen"
 "Mother Earth"

Disc 2
Backstage
A glimpse of Within Temptation backstage during the Mother Earth Tour.

The Making of:
The Mother Earth album and the cover
The "Mother Earth" music video

Credits

Impressions and Interviews
TV West Westpop Interview
Isabelle & Stenders Vroeg 3FM
2 Mxl "Ice Queen" (acoustic)
TMF Awards
Rock Werchter Veronica Special
Face Culture Interview
Interview at Lowlands
Photo gallery

Extras
Broerenkerk Zwolle
"Ice Queen" (multi-angle version)

All versions contain an easter egg track called "Gothic Christmas".

References

Mother Earth Tour
Live video albums
Mother Earth Tour
2002 live albums
GUN Records live albums
GUN Records video albums
Sony BMG video albums